Argyrotaenia chiapasi is a species of moth of the family Tortricidae. It is found in Chiapas, Mexico.

The wingspan is 16–20 mm. The ground colour of the forewings is brownish cream, somewhat suffused with cinnamon brown with some glossy scales. There are brown dots near the apex and subterminally. The markings are rust brown. The hindwings are pale brownish cream.

Etymology
The species name refers to the state of Chiapas.

References

C
Moths of Central America
Moths described in 2010